Forrest City Municipal Airport  is a city-owned public-use airport located four nautical miles (5 mi, 7 km) south of the central business district of Forrest City, in St. Francis County, Arkansas, United States. This airport is included in the FAA's National Plan of Integrated Airport Systems for 2011–2015, which categorized it as a general aviation facility.

Facilities and aircraft 
Forrest City Municipal Airport covers an area of 80 acres (32 ha) at an elevation of 249 feet (76 m) above mean sea level. It has one runway designated 18/36 with an asphalt surface measuring 3,014 by 50 feet (919 x 15 m). For the 12-month period ending July 31, 2010, the airport had 44,300 aircraft operations, an average of 121 per day: 99% general aviation and 1% military.

References

External links 
 Aerial image as of 28 February 2001 from USGS The National Map
 

Airports in Arkansas
Transportation in St. Francis County, Arkansas
Forrest City, Arkansas
Buildings and structures in St. Francis County, Arkansas